Labiobarbus ocellatus is a species of cyprinid fish from Asia that occurs in Malaysia and Indonesia.

References 

 

ocellatus
Cyprinid fish of Asia
Fish of Malaysia
Fish of Indonesia
Taxa named by Johann Jakob Heckel 
Fish described in 1843